The Pamir River is a shared river located in the Badakhshan Province of Afghanistan and in the Gorno-Badakhshan in Tajikistan. It is a tributary of the Panj River, and forms the northern boundary of Afghanistan's Wakhan District.

The river has its sources in the Pamir Mountains in the far eastern part of Gorno-Badakhshan, Tajikistan. It flows between the Alichur mountain range in the north and the Wakhan District in the south. It starts from the Lake Zorkul, at a height of 4130 meters, and then flows towards the west, and later southwest. Near the town of Langar, at 2799 m, it joins the Wakhan River and forms the Panj River. The Pamir forms the boundary between Afghanistan and Tajikistan along its entire length. A road runs along the river on the Tajik side to Khargush where it turns north to join the Pamir Highway. A road of lower quality continues east past Zorkul, almost to the Chinese border.

John Wood was the first known European to try to find the source of the Oxus, or Pamir River. He made a pioneering journey in 1839 and reached Lake Zorkul.

See also
List of rivers in Afghanistan

References

External links 
 Map of the Gorno-Badakhshan region of Tajikistan
Aga Khan Development Network: Wakhan and the Afghan Pamir Map at p. 5

Rivers of Afghanistan
Rivers of Tajikistan
Border rivers
International rivers of Asia
Afghanistan–Tajikistan border
Wakhan
Landforms of Badakhshan Province